The Train of the South — or Tren del Sur in Spanish — is a historic  narrow gauge heritage railroad operating within the U.S. commonwealth of Puerto Rico in Arroyo. It was formed in 1984 to preserve the last surviving sugar cane plantation line still in existence on the entire island, which was part of a large railroad system that operated around Puerto Rico prior to the 1950s.

Overview
The railroad took passengers and sightseers across Arroyo's old sugar cane fields on a fifty-minute long guided tour that explained the industry and other historic aspects of it. Most of the original railroad right-of-way is former Ponce & Guayama trackage, which was in regular use up until 1990; a short  segment became the Tren del Sur in 1984. Much of the original equipment abandoned on site also served as historic props along the route.

After a temporary shutdown in 1988, former Arroyo's mayor Reinaldo Pirela obtained funds from Puerto Rico's government to refit tracks and the transfer of eight Plymouth locomotives from Central Aguirre's stock to restart successful operations in 1996. In 2005, the railroad was temporarily shutdown pending a major restoration project; although all work has been halted in recent years afterwards for unknown reasons. However, the Department of the Interior has plans to re-commission the railroad and extend the system further sometime in the near future. For enforce legal protection of the Tren del Sur, the Puerto Rico Legislative Branch approved first the Law 118-1995 and later the Law 212-2014 that superseded the 1995 law but both laws failed to keep the train running.

Reinaldo Pirela's successor, former Arroyo's mayor Basilio Figueroa (term: 2003-2013), found the Tren del Sur operations too expensive for the Arroyo's municipal budget. As results of past unaccomplished promises of financial assistance from Puerto Rican Legislative and Executive Branches, mayor Figueroa signed a contract with Progressive Southern Railway Inc. (a local company just incorporated in 2005) to refurbish and manage the Tren del Sur. When Progressive Southern Railway took control of the Tren del Sur assets in November 2005, upon premises of that "rails needed to be refitted" dismantled tracks in near-entire  route for "sending to United States for refurbish"; after this, the historical train never resumed operations. Progressive Southern Railway Inc. sued the Arroyo Municipality for remaking a complement of accords, because the Land Authority of Puerto Rico never transferred property of right-of-way to the Municipal Government of Arroyo, asking for $2.5 million in compensation. In 2011, the Arroyo Municipality realized that the lawsuit costs were too expensive, and settled paying $100,000 to Progressive Southern Railway Inc.

Rolling stock
A number of vintage and historic rolling stock equipment exists around the grounds of the Train of the South. Locomotives that once operated the tourist trains until 2005 consist of original plantation-era Plymouth Locomotive Works diesel switcher engines which range from five 18-ton engines to three 40-ton locomotives. The 40-ton Plymouth's are all painted in a direct mirror of the old Atchison, Topeka and Santa Fe Railway red and silver Warbonnet scheme, including the yellow Santa Fe "cigar band" logo with the railroad's name painted within it. Engine #18 was the main locomotive used on all tourist runs, it pulled several converted flatcars with custom built interiors to allow for seating of passengers. Along the route, many of the sidings are filled with abandoned sugar cane related freight cars.

Engine Roster

See also
 List of heritage railroads in the United States
 Rail transport in Puerto Rico
 Metre-gauge railway

References

External links
 Puerto Rico Railroad – Brief information & photographs about the Tren del Sur.
 Travel & Sports: Puerto Rico – "Tren del Sur" Attraction Profile
 Puerto Rico Travel: A Family Adventure Aboard the Tren Del Sur in Arroyo – Tourist article regarding Arroyo and its Tren del Sur.
 El Ultimo Maquinista de Humacao (The Last Machinist of Humacao) Interview with Mr. Wilfredo Molina by Víctor Díaz. From minute 45:05 Mr. Molina tell the history of how the Whitcomb industrial switcher reached to the Tren del Sur. (Amigos del Tren de Isabela / Isabela's Friends of the Train YouTube Channel)  Retrieved February 17, 2021.
 Tren del Sur, Arroyo, Puerto Rico railroad train 1999 A 19-minute video with a full trip on the Tren del Sur in operation at March 7,1999. Retrieved February 17, 2021.

Puerto Rico railroads
Railway lines in Puerto Rico
Passenger rail transport in Puerto Rico
Heritage railroads in Puerto Rico
Railway companies established in 1984
Narrow gauge railroads in Puerto Rico
Tourist attractions in Puerto Rico
Metre gauge railways
Sugar mill railways